The 2000–01 Northern Football League season was the 103rd in the history of Northern Football League, a football competition in England.

Division One

Division One featured 17 clubs which competed in the division last season, along with four new clubs.
 Clubs promoted from Division Two:
 Brandon United
 Hebburn, who also changed name to Hebburn Town
 Newcastle Blue Star
 Plus:
 Whitley Bay, relegated from the Northern Premier League

League table

Division Two

Division Two featured 16 clubs which competed in the division last season, along with three new clubs, relegated from Division One:
 Shotton Comrades
 South Shields
 Thornaby-On-Tees, who also changed name to Thornaby

League table

References

External links
 Northern Football League official site

Northern Football League seasons
2000–01 in English football leagues